COBRA COunter Battery RAdar is a Counter-battery radar system developed jointly by Thales, Airbus Defence and Space and Lockheed Martin for the French, British and German Armed Forces. It is a mobile Active electronically scanned array 3D radar based on a wheeled  chassis for the purpose of enemy field artillery acquisition.

There are believed to be about 20,000 Gallium arsenide integrated circuits in each antenna. This enables the equipment to produce the locations of multiple enemy artillery at extremely long ranges, and the radar is able to cope with saturation type bombardments. In addition there is a high degree of automated software, with high speed circuitry and secure data transmission to escape detection from enemy electronic countermeasures.

Operators

 
 
 
 : In May 2022, it was reported that Ukraine had requested 40 COBRA systems from Germany amid the 2022 Russian invasion of Ukraine. One COBRA system was delivered later in September.

See also 
 AN/TPQ-36 Firefinder radar
 AN/TPQ-37 Firefinder radar
 Swathi Weapon Locating Radar
 Aistyonok

References

Ground radars
Weapon Locating Radar
Military radars
Warning systems